Big Brother 2017 may refer to:

Big Brother Naija 2017
Big Brother 18 (UK)
Big Brother 19 (U.S.)